Replje (in older sources Riplje) is a small village in the Municipality of Trebnje in eastern Slovenia. It lies on the road leading north from Žužemberk towards Zagorica pri Velikem Gabru in the historical region of Lower Carniola. The municipality is now included in the Southeast Slovenia Statistical Region.

References

External links

Replje at Geopedia

Populated places in the Municipality of Trebnje